Nim Vind (born Chris Kirkham) is a Canadian solo musician/artist and songwriter. He describes his sound as "Music for Outsiders". His music has no specific genre but is sometimes referred to as horror punk.

Nim Vind has been compared to the Misfits Social Distortion and Volbeat in the press. He often mentions David Bowie as a major influence.

He has released three albums: The Fashion of Fear (2005) on Fiendforce Records and Nv Music, The Stillness Illness (2009) on Silverdust Records and Soulfood Distro/Nv Music, and Saturday Night Seance Songs on House of Vind with Allegro USA distro. Seance features mixes from Jay Ruston and producer Todd Rundgren. Saturday Night Seance Songs was "Album of the Year" in Rue Morgue magazine. 

Nim Vind was managed by Jon Zazula and also Eric Gardner – Panacea Entertainment.

"Nim Vind" meaning
Nim Vind is a made up name out of a combination of sounds and symbols. Specifically it is to be thought of as a character's name. A definition of "Nim Vind" is freedom by insanity. "Nim" borrows symbolism from the acronym for the National Institute of Mental Health or N.I.M.H. "Vind" borrows symbolism from the word "vindication", representing justification against denial or censure. The strange name is meant to sound alien or somewhat Extra-Terrestrial representing being outside the norm.  Another definition is "aNIMal VINDication".

Career and recordings as Nim Vind 
Chris Kirkham recorded the first Nim Vind album The Fashion of Fear and signed with Germany's Fiendforce Records in 2005. He completed tour cycles in Europe in 2005, 2006, 2007. He released his second album "Stillness Illness" in 2009 with Silverdust Records Europe and played on the "Pain Stage" at the Sold Out Summer Breeze Open Air festival in Germany. 2009 included club touring with Creepshow, Blitzkid, a second appearance with New Model Army, SNFU and more. 

2010 and 2011 saw more European club touring including a tour with American band Filter, and second appearance at the Wave-Gottik-Treffen at Work 2 with the Misfits in Leipzig, Germany. 

Touring in America in 2013 included Tiger Army's October Flame Festival Anaheim USA, Steel Panther at House of Blues in Hollywood and more. 

In 2014 Nim released the "Saturday Night Seance Songs" album. "Astronomicon" was premiered worldwide by Alternative Press Magazine.  The track "Master Spider" was premiered worldwide by BloodDisgusting.com, a horror entertainment website. The album was named "Album of the Year" by Rue Morgue Magazine, a world wide print horror entertainment magazine.

Touring for Saturday Night Seance Songs included a Halloween tour with Gary Numan, Canadian dates with Green Jelly, Doyle from Misfits, European dates with 69 Eyes, European dates with goth legends Christian Death,and Multiple European club tours going through to 2017.

Nim did a Europe festival run including his second appearance at Summer Breeze in 2016. In 2017 he made his third appearance at The Wave Gotik Treffen and released an official video for "Renegades of the End Times". It was shot in Canada and Los Angeles USA. 

In 2017 Nim performed in Russia for the first time, visiting Moscow and St.Petersburg during a European club touring. The "War of the Worlds" video included tour footage from Russia and Europe. A fan video for "That Girl" was posted as a tribute to power girls of horror movies.

2018 Nim completed a full North American Tour with Michale Graves and Argyle Goolsby.

In August 2018, Nim Vind collaborated with writer/director Jeff Frumess to produce a video for the song "Fear O Fear." The video features scenes from Frumess' feature length Gothic-Thriller, Romeo's Distress.

In 2019 Nim released "White Magic", a tribute combining David Bowie's songs Magic Dance" and Dead Man Walking. The single "Sagittarius" was released in 2019, inspired by the Black Hole of Sagittarius A*. The accompanying video was shot in Canada and edited by LA Photographer Michelle Xstar.

Previous band: Mr. Underhill 
Chris Kirkham a.k.a. Nim Vind started his first band called Mr. Underhill. The idea for the sound of the band was to mix the dark art of Bauhaus with the catchy melodies and angst of the Misfits. It originally featured Nim Vind and two other players, but Nim's real life brothers Robbie and Anthony would both soon join. There are three Mr.Underhill EPs that were only sold at shows and speciality stores. The first was "Vamp", which leaned towards the Bauhaus/Bowie side of their sound. That was followed shortly after by the third EP  "Phantasm Drive-In",  which leaned more in a Misfits direction and was the beginning of Nim and his brothers finding their sound. Mr.Underhill gained a strong cult following thanks largely to word of mouth and websites like the original Mp3.com in which they were a prominently featured band. They were especially known for their eccentric outfits made up of giant black hair, long black coats and smeared black make-up, as well as their underground hit "Phantasm Drive-In". Mr.Underhill ended and two bands were formed being Nim Vind (Chris's band) and The Vincent Black Shadow (Rob's).

A 3rd album of lost material was recorded but never released. However, as of Dec 25th 2013 it was restored, remixed, and released as "Nim Vind and Mr.Underhill - The World through X-ray Eyes.

The Vincent Black Shadow 
Rob's band The Vincent Black Shadow incorporated the brothers and enjoyed success at major American radio with the single "Metro". TVBS, as it is referred to by fans, was managed by Jonny Z who signed Metallica, and completed back to back full summers of "The Vans Warped Tour", Joan Jett dates including sold-out shows at Irving Plaza NY, a sold out Euro tour with Kosheen, a sold out Euro tour with fellow Canadian band Silverstein as well as live performances on Much Music, FUSE TV USA and others.

Discography

Studio albums

Singles

Official video singles

References

External links

Canadian rock music groups
Horror punk groups
Musical groups from Vancouver
Musical groups established in 2005
2005 establishments in British Columbia